Vermillion River or Vermilion River or Vermillon River may refer to the following rivers:

Canada
Vermilion River (Alberta)
Vermilion River (British Columbia)
Vermillon River (La Tuque), Quebec
Vermillon River (Chigoubiche River tributary), Quebec
Vermilion River (Lac Seul), Ontario
Vermilion River (Sudbury District), Ontario

United States
Vermilion River (Wabash River tributary), in Illinois and Indiana
Middle Fork Vermilion River
Vermilion River (Illinois River tributary), in Illinois
Vermilion River (Louisiana)
Vermilion River (Minnesota), in northern Minnesota
Vermillion River (Minnesota), in southern Minnesota
Vermilion River (Ohio)
Vermillion River (South Dakota)

See also 
 

 Vermilion (disambiguation)
 Little Vermilion River (disambiguation)
 Vermillion Creek, a tributary of the Green River in Colorado, U.S.
 Vermillion River Formation, a geological formation in Manitoba, Canada